Rony Javier García (born December 19, 1997) is a Dominican professional baseball pitcher for the Detroit Tigers of Major League Baseball (MLB). He made his MLB debut in 2020.

Career

New York Yankees
García signed with the New York Yankees as an international free agent on July 2, 2015. He split the 2016 season between the DSL Yankees and the GCL Yankees, pitching to a 3–5 win–loss record with a 2.28 earned run average (ERA) over 71 innings pitched. He split the 2017 season between the Pulaski Yankees and the Charleston RiverDogs, going a combined 2–3 with a 2.50 ERA over  innings. He split the 2018 season between Charleston and the Tampa Tarpons, going a combined 4–9 with a 4.31 ERA over 119 innings. He split the 2019 season between Tampa and the Trenton Thunder, going a combined 4–13 with a 4.01 ERA over  innings.

Detroit Tigers
On December 12, 2019, the Detroit Tigers selected García with the first selection in the 2019 Rule 5 draft. García made his major league debut on July 28, 2020, and gave up three runs over three innings. With the 2020 Detroit Tigers, García appeared in 15 games, compiling a 1–0 record with 8.14 ERA and 14 strikeouts in 21 innings pitched. García missed spring training in 2021 due to an appendectomy, and started the 2021 season with the Toledo Mud Hens. The Tigers promoted him to the major leagues on May 30, but made just two appearances for the team on the year. On June 15, García was placed on the 60-day injured list with a left knee sprain.

In 2022, García made 16 appearances (8 starts) for the Tigers, working to a 3-3 record and 4.41 ERA with 48 strikeouts in 51.0 innings pitched.

García was optioned to Triple-A Toledo to begin the 2023 season.

References

External links

Living people
1997 births
Major League Baseball players from the Dominican Republic
Major League Baseball pitchers
Detroit Tigers players
Charleston RiverDogs players
Dominican Summer League Yankees players
Gulf Coast Yankees players
Pulaski Yankees players
Tampa Tarpons players
Trenton Thunder players
Estrellas Orientales players